Charles Irving Plosser (born September 19, 1948) is a former president of the Federal Reserve Bank of Philadelphia who served from August 1, 2006, to March 1, 2015. An academic macroeconomist, he is well known for his work on real business cycles, a term which he and John B. Long, Jr. coined. Specifically, he wrote along with Charles R. Nelson in 1982 an influential work entitled "Trends and Random Walks in Macroeconomic Time Series" in which they dealt with the hypothesis of permanent shocks affecting the aggregate product (GDP).

Biography
Plosser was born in Birmingham, Alabama, and graduated from Indian Springs School in Indian Springs, Alabama. He earned a bachelor of engineering degree from Vanderbilt University in 1970, and Ph.D. and M.B.A. degrees from the University of Chicago in 1976 and 1972, respectively.

Before joining the Philadelphia Fed, Plosser was the dean of the William E. Simon Graduate School of Business Administration at the University of Rochester for 12 years.  He also served concurrently as the school's John M. Olin Distinguished Professor of Economics and Public Policy. Plosser was also the co-editor of the Journal of Monetary Economics for over 20 years.

Selected bibliography
 Charles R. Nelson and Charles I. Plosser, September, 1982. "Trends and Random Walks in  Time Series: Some Evidence and Implications," Journal of Monetary Economics, 10(2), pp. 139–162. Abstract.
 John B. Long, Jr. and Charles I. Plosser, 1983. "Real Business Cycles" Journal of Political Economy,  91(1), pp. 39-69 (press +).
 Robert G. King and Charles I. Plosser, 1984. "Money, Credit, and Prices in a Real Business Cycle," American Economic Review, 74(3), p p. 363-380.  Reprinted in Finn E. Kydland, ed., 1995.  Business Cycle Theory, pp. 136-55.
 Robert G. King, Charles I. Plosser, and Sergio T. Rebelo, 1988. "Production, Growth, and Business Cycles: I. The Basic Neoclassical Model," Journal of Monetary Economics, 21(2-3), pp. 195–232. Abstract.
 Charles I. Plosser, 1989.  "Understanding Real Business Cycles," Journal of Economic Perspectives, 3(3), pp. 51-77  (press +).

References

External links

Federal Reserve System biography

Robb, Greg, MarketWatch:
"Fed’s Plosser says current policy very risky", November 15, 2012
"Fed’s Plosser slams QE3", September 25, 2012

|-

|-

1948 births
20th-century American economists
21st-century American economists
Economists from Alabama
Economists from Pennsylvania
Federal Reserve Bank of Philadelphia presidents
Indian Springs School alumni
Living people
University of Chicago Booth School of Business alumni
University of Rochester faculty
Vanderbilt University alumni